Brighi is an Italian surname. Notable people with the surname include:

Marco Brighi (born 1983), Italian footballer, brother of Matteo
Matteo Brighi (born 1981), Italian footballer

Italian-language surnames